The 2011 Berlin Marathon was the 38th edition of the annual marathon event and was held on Sunday 25 September on the streets of Berlin, Germany. The men's race was won by Patrick Makau of Kenya in a world record time of 2:03:38 hours. The women's winner was Florence Kiplagat, also from Kenya, won in a time of 2:19:44 hours, which made her the ninth fastest woman of all-time. It was the first marathon she had completed in her career. In total, 32,991 runners managed to finish the 2011 edition of the marathon, comprising 25,577 men and 7414 women.

Prior to the race, the two favourites for the men's competition were Makau (the defending champion and then-fifth fastest ever) and the world record holder Haile Gebrselassie of Ethiopia – the race marked the first outing since Haile had declared retirement following a poor showing at the 2010 New York City Marathon. There were a large group of pacemakers aiding the elite men for the first part of the race. The leading group, including the two favourites and three others (Edwin Kimaiyo, John Kyui and Emmanuel Samal), reached the halfway point in 61:44 minutes. Makau became the first runner to break away at the 26 km mark and he began zig-zagging along the course in the hope of disrupting Haile Gebrselassie, who followed. The tactic worked as the Ethiopian came to an abrupt halt, later dropping out entirely. Makau sped away unopposed and finished the race with a world record, beating his rival's former mark by 21 seconds. Behind him, Stephen Kwelio Chemlany, who started as a pacemaker, continued to the finish to take second place with a time of 2:07.55 hours and Kimaiyo was third to cross the line in 2:09:50 hours, making it a Kenyan podium sweep.

The two headline athletes for the women's race were Germany's Irina Mikitenko, the 2008 champion, and world record holder Paula Radcliffe of Great Britain. Radcliffe had not raced in a marathon for two years, due to injury and childbirth, and stated that her target was to gain the qualifying time for the 2012 London Olympics. A trio of Russians, Lidiya Grigoryeva, Tatyana Petrova and Nailiya Yulamanova were considered the other main contenders for the elite women's race. However, it was Florence Kiplagat (the 2009 World Cross Country Champion) who assumed the lead at the start of the race and set a fast pace. Only Radcliffe followed, but she fell back after 12 km as she was unable to match the Kenyan's speed. Kiplagat was never overtaken and crossed the line in a time of 2:19:44 hours, becoming the ninth fastest woman of all-time and completing her first ever marathon (she had started the 2011 Boston Marathon but dropped out). Radcliffe was in second place for much of the race, but was overtaken after 33 km by Mikitenko, who ran a more steady-paced race. The German was the eventual runner-up in 2:22:18 hours, while Radcliffe took third with a time of 2:23:46 hours.

The wheelchair races saw Swiss athletes take the top two places: Marcel Hug narrowly defeated Heinz Frei in the men's race and there was just one second between the women's winner Edith Hunkeler and runner-up Sandra Graf. Ewan Fernandez and Sabine Berg were the men's and women's winners in the in-line skating marathon.

Results

Elite races

Elite Men

Elite women

Wheelchair
Men

Women

In-line skating
Men

Women

References

Official results
38. BMW BERLIN-MARATHON 2011. SCC Events. Retrieved on 2011-10-06.

External links

Official Berlin Marathon website

Berlin Marathon
Berlin
Berlin Marathon
2011 in Berlin